Liaoningopterus, sometimes misspelled as "Liaoningopteryx", was a genus of anhanguerid pterodactyloid pterosaur from the Barremian-Aptian-age Lower Cretaceous Jiufotang Formation of Chaoyang, Liaoning, China.

The genus was named in 2003 by Wang Xiaolin and Zhou Zhonghe. The type species is Liaoningopterus gui. The genus name is derived from Liaoning and a Latinized Greek pteron, "wing". The specific name honors Professor Gu Zhiwei, an invertebrate specialist who has pioneered the study of the Jehol Biota.

Description 
The genus is based on holotype IVPP V-13291, a crushed partial skull and skeleton including the jaws, teeth, a cervical vertebra, and bones of the finger supporting the wing. The edge of the upper jaw was very straight. The teeth were only found at the anterior end of the jaws. They were elongated but robust, generally increasing in size from the back to the front. It is exceptional in size compared to the other teeth of Liaoningopterus.

Tooth length in the specimen is very variable, which the authors explained by the presence of recently erupted replacement teeth. There were twenty pairs of teeth in the upper jaws and thirteen or fourteen pairs in the lower jaws. The authors described Liaoningopterus as being probably a piscivore, due to the long, pointed snout. 

Classification
Wang classified Liaoningopterus as a member of the Anhangueridae, mainly because of the crests. This opinion was restated by him in 2005. In 2006 Lü Junchang published a cladistic analysis showing Liaoningopterus to be a basal member of the Anhangueridae; in 2008 an analysis by Ji Qiang had Liaoningopterus in a trichotomy with Anhanguera and Tropeognathus.

Below is a cladogram showing the phylogenetic placement of this genus within Ornithocheirae from Andres and Myers (2013).

See also
 List of pterosaur genera
 Timeline of pterosaur research
 Pterosaur size

References

External links
Liaoningopterus in The Pterosauria

Early Cretaceous pterosaurs of Asia
Pteranodontoids
Fossil taxa described in 2003
Jiufotang fauna
Taxa named by Zhou Zhonghe